NetBus or Netbus is a software program for remotely controlling a Microsoft Windows computer system over a network. It was created in 1998 and has been very controversial for its potential of being used as a trojan horse.

NetBus was written in Delphi by Carl-Fredrik Neikter, a Swedish programmer in March 1998. It was in wide circulation before Back Orifice was released, in August 1998. The author claimed that the program was meant to be used for pranks, not for illegally breaking into computer systems. Translated from Swedish, the name means "NetPrank".

However, use of NetBus has had serious consequences. In 1999, NetBus was used to plant child pornography on the work computer of a law scholar at Lund University. The 3,500 images were discovered by system administrators, and the law scholar was assumed to have downloaded them knowingly. He lost his research position at the faculty, and following the publication of his name fled the country and had to seek professional medical care to cope with the stress. He was acquitted from criminal charges in late 2004, as a court found that NetBus had been used to control his computer.

There are two components to the client–server architecture. The server must be installed and run on the computer that should be remotely controlled. It was an .exe file with a file size of almost 500 KB. The name and icon varied a lot from version to version. Common names were "Patch.exe" and "SysEdit.exe". When started for the first time, the server would install itself on the host computer, including modifying the Windows registry so that it starts automatically on each system startup. The server is a faceless process listening for connections on port 12345 (in some versions, the port number can be adjusted). Port 12346 is used for some tasks, as well as port 20034.

The client was a separate program presenting a graphical user interface that allowed the user to perform a number of activities on the remote computer. Examples of its capabilities:
 Keystroke logging
 Keystroke injection
 Screen captures
 Program launching
 File browsing
 Shutting down the system
 Opening / closing CD-tray
 Tunneling protocol (NetBus connections through a number of systems.)

The NetBus client was designed to support the following operating system versions:
 Windows 95
 Windows 98
 Windows ME
 Windows NT 4.0

Netbus client (v1.70) works fine in Windows 2000 and in Windows XP as well. Major parts of the protocol, used between the client and server interaction (in version 1.70) are textual. Thus the server can be controlled by typing human understandable commands over a raw TCP connection. It is more difficult than using the client application yet allows one to administrate computers with NetBus from operating environments other than Windows, or when original client is not available. Features (such as screen capture) require an application with ability of accepting binary data, such as netcat. Most of more common protocols (like the Internet Relay Chat protocol, POP3 SMTP, HTTP) can also be used over a raw connections in a similar way.

NetBus 2.0 Pro was released in February 1999. It was marketed commercially as a powerful remote administration tool. It was less stealthy, but special hacked versions exist that make it possible to use it for illegal purposes.

All versions of the program were widely used by "script kiddies" and was popularized by the release of Back Orifice. Because of its smaller size, Back Orifice can be used to gain some access to a machine. The attacker can then use Back Orifice to install the NetBus server on the target computer. Most anti-virus programs detect and remove NetBus.

References

External links

 Information about NetBus — Information from anti-virus vendor F-Secure.
 lxnb — A NetBUS client for Linux that works with NetBus 1.60.
 NIL — NIL 0.1b - NIL is a simple Netbus client with a clean interface for Linux.

Common trojan horse payloads
Windows remote administration software
Remote administration software
Pascal (programming language) software